Mugimama Is This Monkey Music? is an album by Mugison, released in 2004. The name of the song "What I Would Say in Your Funeral" has been misspelled at the back of the cover as "What I Would Say in Your Funiral".

Track listing
"I Want You" - 3:53
"The Chicken Song" - 3:04
"Never Give Up" - 0:50
"2 Birds" - 5:06
"What I Would Say In Your Funeral" - 3:53
"Sad as a Truck" - 3:16
"Swing Ding" - 0:28
"I'd Ask" 2:48
"Murr Murr" - 2:52
"Salt" - 3:50
"Hold on to Happiness" - 4:30
"Afi minn" - 9:07

2004 albums
Mugison albums
Ipecac Recordings albums